The Frederick and Anna Maria Reber House is a historic two-story house in Santa Clara, Utah. It was built with stucco in 1870, and designed in the Greek Revival style. The Rebers were immigrants from Switzerland who converted to the Church of Jesus Christ of Latter-day Saints before settling in Santa Clara. It has been listed on the National Register of Historic Places since December 4, 1998.

References

		
National Register of Historic Places in Washington County, Utah
Greek Revival architecture in Utah
Houses completed in 1870
1870 establishments in Utah Territory